In electromagnetism, the Lorenz gauge condition or Lorenz gauge, for Ludvig Lorenz, is a partial gauge fixing of the electromagnetic vector potential by requiring  The name is frequently confused with Hendrik Lorentz, who has given his name to many concepts in this field. The condition is Lorentz invariant. The Lorenz condition is used to eliminate the redundant spin-0 component in the  representation theory of the Lorentz group. It is equally used for massive spin-1 fields where the concept of gauge transformations does not apply at all.

Description
In electromagnetism, the Lorenz condition is generally used in calculations of time-dependent electromagnetic fields through retarded potentials. The condition is

where  is the four-potential, the comma denotes a partial differentiation and the repeated index indicates that the Einstein summation convention is being used. The condition has the advantage of being Lorentz invariant. It still leaves substantial gauge degrees of freedom.

In ordinary vector notation and SI units, the condition is

In Gaussian units the condition is

A quick justification of the Lorenz gauge can be found using Maxwell's equations and the relation between the magnetic vector potential and the magnetic field:

Therefore,

Since the curl is zero, that means there is a scalar function  such that 

This gives the well known equation for the electric field, 

This result can be plugged into the Ampère–Maxwell equation,

This leaves,

To have Lorentz invariance, the time derivatives and spatial derivatives must be treated equally (i.e. of the same order). Therefore, it is convenient to choose the Lorenz gauge condition, which gives the result

A similar procedure with a focus on the electric scalar potential and making the same gauge choice will yield

These are simpler and more symmetric forms of the inhomogeneous Maxwell's equations. Note that the Coulomb gauge also fixes the problem of Lorentz invariance, but leaves a coupling term with first-order derivatives.

Here
 

History
When originally published, Lorenz's work was not received well by Maxwell. Maxwell had eliminated the Coulomb electrostatic force from his derivation of the electromagnetic wave equation since he was working in what would nowadays be termed the Coulomb gauge. The Lorenz gauge hence contradicted Maxwell's original derivation of the EM wave equation by introducing a retardation effect to the Coulomb force and bringing it inside the EM wave equation alongside the time varying electric field, which was introduced in Lorenz's paper "On the identity of the vibrations of light with electrical currents". Lorenz's work was the first symmetrizing shortening of Maxwell's equations after Maxwell himself published his 1865 paper. In 1888, retarded potentials came into general use after Heinrich Rudolf Hertz's experiments on electromagnetic waves. In 1895, a further boost to the theory of retarded potentials came after J. J. Thomson's interpretation of data for electrons (after which investigation into electrical phenomena changed from time-dependent electric charge and electric current distributions over to moving point charges).

See also
 Gauge fixing

References

External links and further reading
General
 

Further reading
 
 
See also 
 
 

History

 

Electromagnetism
Concepts in physics